Blarians is a commune in the Doubs department in the Bourgogne-Franche-Comté region in eastern France.

Population

Geography
Blarians is a small commune: its municipal area covers 0.89 square kilometers, ranging between 227 and 267 meters elevation. It is bounded on the northern, western, and southern sides by the river Ognon.

See also
 Communes of the Doubs department

References

Communes of Doubs